The Queenscliff Football Netball Club, nicknamed the Coutas (short for "barracouta", a type of fish), is an Australian rules football and netball club that plays in the Bellarine Football League and is situated in the township of Queenscliff, Victoria, on the Bellarine Peninsula. 

Queenscliff teams currently play in the Bellarine Football League, of which the club is a founding member. Queenscliff plays its home games at the Queenscliff Recreation Reserve.  

Queenscliff also has a junior section with under 10s, under 12s, under 14s, under 16s, under 18s along with the reserves and the seniors.

History 
The club was established in 1884, just as the fishing-village of Queenscliff began to gain popularity as a tourist destination, due in part to the railway line from Geelong which had recently been completed. The Coutas played in an early version of the Bellarine Football League that ran from 1895 to 1914. Reformed after World War I, the club continued to play locally until 1923 when it joined the Geelong Football Association where it enjoyed some success. 

Queenscliff played the 1957 season in the Polwarth Football League and continued in this league until the Bellarine Football League was formed in 1971. During its years in the Polwarth league, Queenscliff dominated it with Kevin Coltish at full-forward, winning seven premierships in eight seasons.

After the formation of the Bellarine League in 1971, Queenscliff remained a power club for some time, winning a premiership in 1975. But after that achievement, a 36-year premiership drought followed. Queenscliff's return to greatness came in 2011 when the club won its second BFL premiership, repeating the feat 2012 and 2013 to mark a rare three-peat.

Premierships 
 Queenscliff Football Association (4):
  1899, 1900, 1901, 1902  
 Queenscliff & Bellarine Football Association (7):
 1904, 1905, 1907, 1908, 1910, 1913, 1920
 Geelong Football Association (2):
 1929, 1937  
 Polwarth Football League (7):
 1961, 1962, 1963, 1964, 1965, 1967, 1968
 Bellarine Football League (4):
 1975, 2011, 2012, 2013

League best and fairests 

 1952: Keith Wayth
 1954: Keith Wayth
 1976: Robert Warren
 1977: Mike Birrell
 1978: Mike Birrell
 1988: Dean McNeil
 1993: Jamie Dalton
 2003: Matt Primmer
 2011: Dylan Chaplin-Burch

Highest win 
 1976 season, rd 8: Queenscliff 44.23 (287) v Newcomb 5.4 (34)

Notable VFL/AFL players 
Terry Farman with Geelong
George 'Jocka' Todd with Geelong 
Ron Shapter with South Melbourne, Fitzroy and Essendon
Darcy Gardiner with Brisbane

Bibliography
 Cat Country: History of Football in the Geelong Region by John Stoward – Aussie Footy Books, 2008 –

References

External links
 Twitter page
 Facebook page
 Team app

Bellarine Football League
Australian rules football clubs in Victoria (Australia)
Australian rules football clubs established in 1884
Sports clubs established in 1884
1884 establishments in Australia
Netball teams in Victoria (Australia)
Borough of Queenscliffe